Phetchabun is a town (thesaban mueang) in Thailand, capital of Phetchabun Province. It covers the tambon Nai Mueang of the Phetchabun District, along the Pa Sak River. As of 2005, it had a population of 23,823.

Etymology
From historical evidence, it is believed that Phetchabun was established by two kingdoms, the Sukhothai Kingdom and the Ayutthaya Period of King Narai. Initially the province was called "Phe-cha-buth" as "Phuenchapura", which means 'town that grows plenty of crops', as the province is very fertile.

Geography
The Pa Sak River runs through the east side of Phetchabun from north to south. The town lies in a valley; the two ranges of the Phetchabun Mountains rise to both the east and west.

Climate
Phetchabun has a tropical savanna climate (Köppen climate classification Aw). Winters are dry and very warm. The monsoon season runs from late April through early October, with heavy rain and somewhat cooler temperatures during the day, with nights remaining warm.

Transportation
The main road through the city is Route 21, from Lom Sak to the south through Phetchabun to Chai Badan and Saraburi.

Phetchabun is served by Phetchabun Airport,  to the north.

Notable people
 Saiphin Moore, Thai chef

References

External links

Populated places in Phetchabun province

wuu:Phetchabun Province